Merson is a surname. Notable people with the surname include:
Billy Merson (1879–1947), English music hall performer and songwriter
George F. Merson (1866–1959), Scottish pharmacist who produced surgical catgut
Jack Merson (1922–2000), former second baseman in Major League Baseball
Luc-Olivier Merson (1846–1920), French academic painter and illustrator also known for his postage stamp and currency designs
Paul Merson (born 1968), retired English football player, and former player-manager of Walsall